Abdulrahman Ibrahim (born 9 November 1974) is a former Emirati footballer. He played as center-back and was considered one of the best defenders in the UAE League. He was one of the favourite defenders to be selected for the different U.A.E. national teams (Youth, Olympic and Men).

Ibrahim is praised for his remarkable long-range golden goal against Iraq in the quarterfinals of the 1996 AFC Asian Cup held in the UAE.

References

External links

1974 births
Living people
Emirati footballers
Al-Shaab CSC players
Ajman Club players
Footballers at the 1998 Asian Games
Association football defenders
UAE Pro League players
Asian Games competitors for the United Arab Emirates
United Arab Emirates international footballers